The Peshawar women's cricket team is the women's representative cricket team for Peshawar. They competed in the National Women's Cricket Championship between 2004–05 and 2017.

History
Peshawar joined the National Women's Cricket Championship for its inaugural season in 2004–05, losing to Hyderabad in the initial knock-out stage. The side went on to compete in every edition of the National Women's Cricket Championship until it ended in 2017. Their best finish came in 2005–06, when they won the Rawalpindi Zone of the competition to progress to the Final Stage group, where they finished third out of the three teams that qualified.

Players

Notable players
Players who played for Peshawar and played internationally are listed below, in order of first international appearance (given in brackets):

 Qanita Jalil (2005)

Seasons

National Women's Cricket Championship

Honours
 National Women's Cricket Championship:
 Winners (0):
 Best finish: 3rd (2005–06)

See also
 Peshawar cricket team

References

Women's cricket teams in Pakistan
Cricket in Peshawar